Dromod railway station  serves the village of Dromod in County Leitrim and nearby Roosky in County Roscommon. It is a station on the Dublin Connolly to Sligo InterCity service.

The station is shared with the short preserved section of the Cavan and Leitrim Railway.

History
The station opened on 3 December 1862 and remains in operation, despite closing for goods services on 3 November 1975.
Dromod was also a station on the narrow gauge Cavan and Leitrim Railway. It opened on 24 October 1887  and finally closed on 1 April 1959. A short section of narrow gauge line has been reopened at the station as part of preservation efforts.

See also
 List of railway stations in Ireland

References

External links
 Irish Rail Dromod Station Website

Iarnród Éireann stations in County Leitrim
Railway stations in County Leitrim
Railway stations opened in 1862
1862 establishments in Ireland
Railway stations in the Republic of Ireland opened in the 19th century